The 1917–18 Syracuse Orangemen basketball team represented Syracuse University in intercollegiate basketball during the 1917–18 season. The team finished the season with a 16–1 record and was retroactively named the national champion by the Helms Athletic Foundation and the Premo-Porretta Power Poll. Joseph Schwarzer was named a 1918 NCAA All-American upon the conclusion of the season as well.

Schedule and results

|-
!colspan=9 style="background:#FF6F00; color:#FFFFFF;"| Regular season

Source

References

External links
 OrangeHoops.com recap of 1917–18 season

Syracuse Orange men's basketball seasons
NCAA Division I men's basketball tournament championship seasons
Syracuse
Syracuse Orangemen Basketball Team
Syracuse Orangemen Basketball Team